Raju Gari Gadhi  is a 2015 Indian Telugu-language horror comedy film directed by Ohmkar, starring Ashwin Babu and Dhanya Balakrishna  which is produced by Varahi Chalana Chitram, AK Entertainments Pvt. Ltd and OAK Entertainments Pvt. Ltd. Sai Karthik composed the film's soundtrack. Gnanam took charge of the film's cinematography. Upon release, the film received mixed reviews but it was commercially successful. Raja Gari Gadhi was dubbed in Hindi as Raja Saheb Ka Kamra & Also Raja Gari Gadhi was dubbed in Tamil as Mudinja Vaazhu . A sequel entitled Raju Gari Gadhi 2 was released in October 2017 while third sequel Raju Gari Gadhi 3 was released in 2019, all of which are part of Raju Gari Gadhi film series.

Plot 
There is a haunted house in Nandigama. Dead bodies of 34 people have resurfaced there for over a period of time.

Six months later, a TV channel plans to host a reality show in that haunted house. It is aptly called “Dhayyam tho 7 Rojulu, Pattukunte 3 Kotlu” (Those who spend 7 days in this haunted Nandigama palace and survive will get Rs. 3 crores). Seven individuals namely, Ashwin (Ashwin Babu), Nandu (Chethan Cheenu), Barbie (Eshanya), Bala Tripura Sundari (Dhanya Balakrishna), Shivudu (Dhanraj), M Y Danam (Shankar) and Bujjimma (Vidyullekha Raman) are selected for the show. Program head Pakoddi (Prabhas Sreenu) and Chekodi (Raghu Babu) have arranged all kinds of scares for the contestants.

Initially, everything is normal. But after some time, the contestants start feeling paranormal activities around them. Everyone begins to believe that the palace is indeed haunted, especially Ashwin. The only exception is Nandu, a doctor who refuses to accept such supernatural stories. Meanwhile, Ashwin reveals his past to Bala. His brother Dr. Karthik (Rajiv Kanakala) had begun revolution of donating organs. But suddenly, he was found dead, and his body was discovered at the Mahal in Nandigama. Seeing Dr. Karthik's corpse, Ashwin's mother suffered from strokes, and only to pay for the hospital charges, Ashwin has participated in this contest.

The show progresses, and the hauntings and attacks on the contestants increase, causing the death of one of them (Shivudu). Nandu is convinced now, like others, that the house is haunted. But this time, it is Ashwin who claims there are no ghosts here, which leaves everyone shocked.

To investigate further, Ashwin goes around the palace alone and discovers a secret chamber. From there, he extracts his deceased brother's mobile phone. Ashwin shows the phone to Bala and on turning it on, they find a video shot by Dr. Karthik. The doctor had visited this palace, and discovered the same secret chamber where bodies were being mutilated. However, before he could expose the culprits, he was killed, his death being recorded on the phone. The culprits, caught on camera, are none other than Nandu and Barbie.

In the next scene, Ashwin and Bala are injured and captured by Nandu in the chamber. Nandu and Barbie threaten Ashwin that he has been caught, and should he reveal the truth, Bala will be killed and her body mutilated. But here, the final mystery of the movie is disclosed. It is revealed that it is not Ashwin but Nandu who has been trapped.

In reality, there are no ghosts in the palace at all. This whole reality show was set up by Ashwin with the help of police and media to catch the real murderers of his brother, and 30 others who died in the palace. Nandu and Barbie run an organ smuggling racket here. Ashwin had suspected them, which is why they were selected. It is further revealed that all the hauntings that occurred few days ago with Barbie and others were orchestrated by Ashwin and Shivudu (the latter is revealed to be alive in the end).

The film ends with Ashwin being interviewed on his experience and how he donated the rest of the money to charity.

Cast 

 Ashwin Babu as Ashwin  
 Chethan Cheenu as Dr. Nandan / Nandu 
 Dhanya Balakrishna as Bala Tripura Sundari / Bala
 Dhanraj as Shivudu
 Rajiv Kanakala as Dr. Karthik
 Posani Krishna Murali as Bommali Raja
 Saptagiri as "Race Gurram" Babji
 Shakalaka Shankar as M Y Danam
 Poorna as Bommali
 Vidyullekha Raman as Bujjimma
 Eshanya Maheshwari as Barbie
 Raghu Babu as Chekodi
 Prabhas Sreenu as Pakoddi
 Jeeva

Sequel
After its success, in 2016, PVP Cinema made a sequel to the movie and titled it as Raju Gari Gadhi 2 which was released on 13 October 2017 with Nagarjuna and Samantha Akkineni as leads with Vennela Kishore and Seerat Kapoor in pivot roles. Ohmkar reprises his role as director of the movie. This movie also gained good profit and enjoyed success all over. Another sequel titled Raju Gari Gadhi 3 has been released with Ashwin Babu and Avika Gor . Raju Gari Gadhi 2 and Raju Gari Gadhi 3 are two sequels made which were released on 13 October 2017 and 18 October 2019 respectively.

Soundtrack

The soundtrack of the film was composed by Sai Karthik.

See also
Highest-grossing Telugu franchises and film series

References 

2015 films
2010s Telugu-language films
Indian comedy horror films
2015 comedy horror films
Vaaraahi Chalana Chitram films
Films set in Hyderabad, India
Films scored by Sai Karthik
Films directed by Ohmkar